Poltair School is a coeducational secondary school located on the site of the former St Austell Grammar School in St Austell, Cornwall, England.

Admissions
It has educational links with schools in Dithmarchen, Germany, notably the Gymnasium Heide-Ost. It has also had links with Collège des Quatre Vents in Lanmeur, Brittany, France.

History

Grammar school
It was founded in 1907.

Comprehensive
It became comprehensive in 1971, at the same time that it lost its sixth form. St Austell Sixth Form College was built at the same time next to the Mid-Cornwall College of Further Education on Palace Road. These merged in 1993 to form St Austell College, opposite the school.

In 2007, Poltair School held its centenary, which included guided tours of the school, a service at St John's Methodist Church, and celebrations at St Austell's Eden Project.

Academy 
In September 2019 Poltair School converted to academy status and is now sponsored by the Cornwall Education & Learning Trust.

Buildings
The school has recently undergone a £5 million redevelopment programme, which included a new main hall, dining hall, radio studio, and dance/drama facilities, amongst other additions.

The school launched a full student radio station, Inferno Radio, in 2004. This is no longer running.

Academic performance
The school's GCSE pass rate increased 16% in the 2 years up until July 2007. However its GCSE pass rate is well below the England average, and the second lowest in Cornwall (above Redruth School).

Notable former pupils
 Steve Double, Conservative MP since 2015 for St Austell and Newquay
 Steve Baker, Conservative MP since 2010 for Wycombe

St Austell County Grammar School

 Robert Duncan, actor
 Felicity Goodey CBE DL, former presenter on Radio 4 and BBC North West Tonight
 Sir Laurence Martin, Vice-Chancellor from 1978 to 1990 of Newcastle University, and gave the BBC's Reith Lecture in 1981.
 John Nettles, actor
 A. L. Rowse, academic and author.
 Robin Skynner, psychiatrist, known for 1983 book Families and How to Survive Them
 L. H. C. Tippett, statistician
 David Tremlett, artist
 Fred Trethewey, former Archdeacon of Dudley
 Edward Rowe (actor), Cornish comedian and theatre actor (AKA:Kernow King)

References

Sources
 The Times Monday 30 October 1972, page 12

External links
 EduBase

Secondary schools in Cornwall
Academies in Cornwall
Educational institutions established in 1907
St Austell
1907 establishments in England